Osarenren Okungbowa (born 13 May 1995) is an Austrian professional footballer who plays as a defensive midfielder for WSG Tirol.

Club career
Okungbowa joined Rapid Wien in 2010 from the amateur club Donaufeld. He made his professional debut for Rapid Wien in a 2–1 loss against Sturm Graz on 27 November 2016.

On 18 January 2019, Okungbowa signed for the rest of the season with Floridsdorfer AC.

He signed for German 3. Liga side VfB Lübeck on a one-year contract in July 2020. He followed that up with a stint with Kickers Offenbach from 2021 to 2022 before returning to Austria with WSG Tirol on 3 August 2022.

International career
Okungbowa is born in Austria to Nigerian parents.

References

External links
 
 Okungbowa Eurosport Profile
 

1994 births
Living people
Footballers from Vienna
Austrian footballers
Austrian people of Nigerian descent
Association football midfielders
SK Rapid Wien players
SKN St. Pölten players
Floridsdorfer AC players
VfB Lübeck players
Kickers Offenbach players
WSG Tirol players
Austrian Football Bundesliga players
2. Liga (Austria) players
3. Liga players
Austrian expatriate footballers
Expatriate footballers in Germany
Austrian expatriate sportspeople in Germany